The sixth season of Saturday Night Live, an American sketch comedy series, originally aired in the United States on NBC between November 15, 1980, and April 11, 1981.

This season was alternatively known as Saturday Night Live '80.

Background
Executive producer Lorne Michaels cited burnout as the reason behind his desire to take a year off, and had been led to believe by NBC executives that the show would go on hiatus with him, and be ready to start fresh upon his return. 

Jean Doumanian hired Denny Dillon, Gilbert Gottfried, Gail Matthius, Eddie Murphy, Joe Piscopo, Ann Risley and Charles Rocket (who was groomed to be the new breakout star) as repertory players, and Yvonne Hudson, Matthew Laurance and Patrick Weathers as featured players. In doing so, she passed on such then-unknown performers as Jim Carrey, Mercedes Ruehl, Sandra Bernhard, John Goodman and Paul Reubens. Andy Kaufman offered to contribute a weekly segment but was turned down. Jean Doumanian sought a non-white cast member to fill Garrett Morris' previous role. As SNL scholars Doug Hill and Jeff Weingrad phrase it,

Jean still needed an ethnic, and a special series of auditions was set up to find one. For two days in mid-September some thirty black actors and comedians filed through the writers' wing on the 17th floor [of Rockefeller Center] to read for Jean and her people. At the end, Jean told her group she was leaning toward hiring a stand-up by the name of Charlie Barnett. But talent coordinator Neil Levy had another black performer he wanted her to see, a kid from Roosevelt, Long Island, named Eddie Murphy.

Some accounts state that Jean Doumanian preferred instead Robert Townsend, but Eddie Murphy was added (as a featured player) starting with the fourth episode, after much convincing from her colleagues and staff.

Dick Ebersol's first produced episode was on April 11, 1981. After Ebersol's first episode, the 1981 Writers Guild of America strike started, forcing the show into a hiatus during which it was extensively retooled. Before the next season, Ebersol also fired Denny Dillon and Gail Matthius, leaving Eddie Murphy and Joe Piscopo the only remaining cast members from Jean Doumanian's tenure.

Cast

(Episodes 1–12)

Repertory players
Denny Dillon
Gilbert Gottfried
Gail Matthius
Eddie Murphy (first episode: December 6, 1980/upgraded to repertory status on January 24, 1981)
Joe Piscopo
Ann Risley 
Charles Rocket 

Featured players
Yvonne Hudson (first episode: December 20, 1980)
Matthew Laurance (first episode: December 13, 1980)
Patrick Weathers (first episode: December 13, 1980/last episode: February 14, 1981)

bold denotes Weekend Update anchor

(Episode 13)

Repertory players
Denny Dillon
Robin Duke 
Tim Kazurinsky 
Gail Matthius
Eddie Murphy 
Joe Piscopo
Tony Rosato

Featured players
Laurie Metcalf
Emily Prager (credited, but did not appear)

Writers

Brian Doyle-Murray returned as the only writer from the previous season. Pamela Norris and Terry Sweeney were also hired; the latter would become a cast member in 1985. Musician and Smothers Brothers Comedy Hour writer Mason Williams was the season's first head writer but left after clashing with Doumanian. Jeremy Stevens and Tom Moore joined as head writers for the remaining Doumanian shows. Michael O'Donoghue was rehired after Doumanian's firing.

This season's writers included Larry Arnstein, Barry W. Blaustein, Billy Brown, Ferris Butler, John DeBellis, Jean Doumanian, Nancy Dowd, Brian Doyle-Murray, Leslie Fuller, Mel Green, David Hurwitz, Judy Jacklin, Sean Kelly, Mitchell Kriegman, Patricia Marx, Douglas McGrath, Tom Moore, Matt Neuman, Pamela Norris, Michael O'Donoghue, Mark Reisman, David Sheffield, Jeremy Stevens, Terry Sweeney, Bob Tischler, Mason Williams and Dirk Wittenborn.

Episodes

Critical reception 
Responses to Doumanian's SNL were negative. The Associated Press, mocking the Carters-in-the-Oval-Office sketch, wrote, "The new Saturday Night Live is essentially crude, sophomoric and most of all self-consciously 'cool.' It is occasionally funny... Under producer Jean Doumanian, Saturday Night Live will define 'risk-taking' as a little naughtier, perhaps a little raunchier; it won't wander too far off the beaten path... They're all clones. This is television. If they can be funny once in a while, that's all we can ask."

The New York Times said the season "looked almost exactly as it did in previous years, but actually only the shell remained". The review went on to state that the "missing ingredient was the very quality that made the old show so special: an innovative vision", and that the new show was "nothing so much as an unfunny parody of its predecessor".

Hill and Weingrad summarized other reviews: 

The Washington Star said the show "strained and groaned" while the humor was "almost completely lost, despite desperate attempts to wring it out of raunch." Newsday's Marvin Kitman, as expected, ravaged the show gleefully, calling it "offensive and raunchy," and worse, not funny. "This new edition is terrible," he wrote. "Call it 'Saturday Night Dead on Arrival'."

Tom Shales had always been Saturday Night's strongest and most prestigious booster, and thus his reaction to the new show was more important than most. The headline on his review read FROM YUK TO YECCCH. The first sentence was: "Vile from New York—It's Saturday Night." The show, Shales said, was a "snide and sordid embarrassment". It imitated the "ribaldry and willingness to prod sacred cows" of the Lorne Michaels years without having the least "compensating satirical edge". It was, he wrote, "just haplessly pointless tastelessness". Shales concluded that despite one or two imaginative moments from the show's filmmakers, "from the six new performers and 13 new writers hired for the show, viewers got virtually no good news."... Jean made it clear that she thought the writing was primarily at fault. "It's just got to be funnier," she said. Then she put a tape of the show on her videocassette machine to begin a sketch-by-sketch critique. According to writer Billy Brown, as she did she said, "Watch this. And I hope you hate it, because you wrote it."

In his book What Were They Thinking? The 100 Dumbest Events in Television History, author David Hofstede included this season as one of 25 runners-up to the list.

References

06
1980 American television seasons
1981 American television seasons
Saturday Night Live in the 1980s